Rale Mićić (born October 9, 1975) is a Serbian jazz guitarist and composer.

Micic moved to United States in 1995 after receiving a scholarship from the Berklee College of Music, where he studied with George Garzone, John Thomas, and Bob Brookmeyer. It was also by that time that Mick Goodrick, became his mentor.

In 2000, Micic moved to New York City. His debut album, Bridges (CTA, 2003), mixed jazz with Balkan music. His second album, Serbia, featured jazz trumpeter Tom Harrell.

In 2010 Micic started a guitar duo series called Guitar x2. During the next decade, many prominent jazz guitarist performed as a part of the duo series, including Peter Bernstein, Gene Bertoncini, Ed Cherry, Jack Wilkins, Lage Lund, Mike Moreno, and many more.

Discography

As leader
 Bridges (CTA, 2003)
 Serbia (CTA, 2006)
 3 (CTA, 2010) 
 Night Music (Whaling City Sound, 2016) 
 Only Love Will Stay (Whaling City Sound, 2021)

As co-leader
 Inspired (ArtistShare, 2016) with John Abercrombie, Peter Bernstein, and Lage Lund

As sideman
With Tom Harrell
First Impressions (High Note, 2015)

References

External links
 Official website

1975 births
Living people
Musicians from Belgrade
Berklee College of Music alumni
Serbian jazz guitarists
21st-century guitarists